The Wichita, KS Metropolitan Statistical Area, as defined by the United States Office of Management and Budget, is an area consisting of four counties in south central Kansas, anchored by the city of Wichita. As of the 2013 American Community Survey, the MSA had a population of 637,989.

Counties
Butler
Harvey
Sedgwick
Sumner

Communities
Populations are from the 2020 census.

Places with more than 300,000 inhabitants
Wichita (Principal city) Pop: 397,532

Places with 10,000 to 30,000 inhabitants
Derby Pop: 25,625
Newton Pop: 18,602
Andover Pop: 14,892
El Dorado Pop: 12,870
Arkansas City Pop: 11,974
Winfield Pop: 11,777
Haysville Pop: 11,262

Places with 5,000 to 10,000 inhabitants
Augusta Pop: 9,256
Park City Pop: 8,333
Bel Aire Pop: 8,262
Wellington Pop: 7,715
Valley Center Pop: 7,340
Mulvane Pop: 6,286
Maize Pop: 5,735
Goddard Pop: 5,084

Places with 1,000 to 5,000 inhabitants
Rose Hill Pop: 4,185
Hesston Pop: 3,505
Oaklawn-Sunview (census-designated place) Pop: 2,880
Clearwater Pop: 2,653
Kechi Pop: 2,217
Cheney Pop: 2,181
Halstead Pop: 2,179
North Newton Pop: 1,814
McConnell Air Force Base (census-designated place) Pop: 1,636
Sedgwick Pop: 1,603
Douglass Pop: 1,555
Belle Plaine Pop: 1,467
Colwich Pop: 1,455
Towanda Pop: 1,447
Conway Springs Pop: 1,086
Oxford Pop: 1,048
Caldwell Pop: 1,025

Places with fewer than 1,000 inhabitants
Garden Plain Pop: 948
Benton Pop: 943
Andale Pop: 941
Burrton Pop: 861
Mount Hope Pop: 806
Eastborough Pop: 756
Leon Pop: 669
Whitewater Pop: 661
Bentley Pop: 560
Argonia Pop: 456
Potwin Pop: 421
South Haven Pop: 324
Elbing Pop: 226
Walton Pop: 219
Geuda Springs (partial) Pop: 158
Viola Pop: 115
Cassoday Pop: 113
Latham Pop: 96
Mayfield Pop: 75
Milan Pop: 56
Hunnewell Pop: 44

Unincorporated places
Beaumont
Bois d'Arc
Corbin
Peck
Schulte

Demographics
As of the census of 2000, there were 571,166 people, 220,440 households, and 149,768 families residing within the MSA. The racial makeup of the MSA was 82.36% White, 7.51% African American, 1.06% Native American, 2.73% Asian, 0.05% Pacific Islander, 3.67% from other races, and 2.62% from two or more races. Hispanic or Latino of any race were 7.23% of the population.

The median income for a household in the MSA was $42,070, and the median income for a family was $50,202. Males had a median income of $37,025 versus $24,444 for females. The per capita income for the MSA was $19,519.

Combined Statistical Area
The Wichita–Winfield Combined Statistical Area is made up of five counties in south central Kansas. The statistical area includes one metropolitan area and one micropolitan area. As of the 2000 Census, the CSA had a population of 607,457 (though a July 1, 2009 estimate placed the population at 646,317).

Metropolitan Statistical Areas (MSAs)
Wichita (Butler, Harvey, Sedgwick, and Sumner counties)
Micropolitan Statistical Areas (μSAs)
Winfield (Cowley County)

See also

Kansas census statistical areas

References

 http://2010.census.gov/2010census/popmap/

 
Butler County, Kansas
Harvey County, Kansas
Sedgwick County, Kansas
Sumner County, Kansas
Metropolitan areas of Kansas